Pablo Groeber (born Paul Friedrich Karl Gröber; 1885–1964) was a German geologist known for his contributions to the understanding of the geology of Tien Shan in Central Asia and the Andes of Nequén and Mendoza Province in Argentina.

See also
Juan Brüggen
Henning Illies
Walther Penck
Gustav Steinmann

References

External links
Paul Gröber (1885-1964), Archiv für Geographie, Leibniz-Institut für Länderkunde (IfL), Leipzig.

20th-century  German geologists
Tectonicists
Ludwig Maximilian University of Munich alumni
Academic staff of the University of Buenos Aires
Academic staff of the National University of La Plata
Servicio Geológico Minero personnel
German emigrants to Argentina
1885 births
1964 deaths
University of Strasbourg alumni
Scientists from Strasbourg